This is a list of building materials.  Many types of building materials are used in the construction industry to create buildings and structures.

These categories of materials and products are used by architects and construction project managers to specify the materials and methods used for building projects.

Some building materials like cold rolled steel framing are considered modern methods of construction, over the traditionally slower methods like blockwork and timber.  Many building materials have a variety of uses, therefore it is always a good idea to consult the manufacturer to check if a product is best suited to your requirements.

Catalogs
Catalogs distributed by architectural product suppliers are typically organized into these groups.

Industry standards
The Construction Specifications Institute maintains the following industry standards:
MasterFormat 50 standard divisions of building materials - 2004 edition (current in 2009)
16 Divisions Original 16 divisions of building materials

See also

Category: Building materials
Alternative natural materials
List of commercially available roofing material
Red List building materials

Sources

Building Materials: Dangerous Properties of Products in MasterFormat Divisions 7 and 9 - H. Leslie Simmons, Richard J. Lewis, Richard J. Lewis (Sr.) - Google Books
Building Materials - P.C. Varghese - Google Books
Architectural Building Materials - Salvan, George S. - Google Books
Durability of Building Materials and Components 8: Service Life and Asset Management - Michael A. Lacasse, Dana J. Vanier - Google Books
Durability of Building Materials and Components - J. M. Baker - Google Books
Understanding Green Building Materials - Traci Rose Rider, Stacy Glass, Jessica McNaughton - Google Books
Heat-Air-Moisture Transport: Measurements on Building Materials - Phālgunī Mukhopādhyāẏa, M. K. Kumaran - Google Books

What is MMC – Modern Methods of Construction?

External links

Building materials
Building materials